Golf Central is Golf Channel's news program. It was launched in 1995, in the same year as the network it airs on.

A nightly half-hour show, Golf Central features news and highlights from the major golf tours and events of the world, in addition to on-site reports from tournaments.

Format
The show's format involving anchors varies — sometimes there is just one anchor on the desk for a show; sometimes an anchor is joined by an analyst for tournament recaps; or two anchors will be used. With the recent additions of new talent for the show, the latter format has been utilized more recently. There is never one mainstay anchor team, as anchor teams vary from night to night.

While tournaments are in progress, editions of Golf Central air every half hour to provide updates on the current event, including highlights and leaderboards. During notable golf events (such as the Men's major tournaments and the Ryder Cup, among others), Golf Channel also airs special Live From editions of Golf Central before and after their respective broadcastswhich provides special extended coverage on-location from tournament sites; including analysis and coverage of press conferences.

Anchors and other contributors
Talent on the show varies from night to night, but in the show's rotation are 4 people who appear on the show in anchor roles. Those people are Cara Banks, Rich Lerner, Anna Jackson, Jimmy Roberts, Todd Lewis, Steve Burkowski, Amy Rogers and Matt Adams. The show also features a number of analysts who appear regularly to give opinions and insight, these include Brandel Chamblee, Jim Gallagher, Jr, Tripp Isenhour and Billy Kratzert.

External links
Golf Central official website
 
Golf Central Twitter Channel

Golf Channel original programming
1995 American television series debuts
1990s American television news shows
2000s American television news shows
2010s American television news shows
2020s American television news shows
Golf on NBC